George H. Storck (October 11, 1930 – February 12, 2015) was an American football coach. The head coach at Franklin & Marshall College in Lancaster, Pennsylvania, he held that position for five seasons, from 1963 until 1967. His record at Franklin & Marshall was 20–17–2.

Biography
Born on October 11, 1930, in Plattsburgh, New York, Storck attended Swarthmore High School in Swarthmore, Pennsylvania.

Head coaching record

Football

References

1930 births
2015 deaths
Franklin & Marshall Diplomats football coaches
Lebanon Valley Flying Dutchmen football coaches
Widener Pride football coaches
College track and field coaches in the United States
College wrestling coaches in the United States
Dartmouth College alumni
People from Plattsburgh, New York
Sportspeople from Delaware County, Pennsylvania